The Sirhowy River (Welsh language : Afon Sirhywi) is a river in Wales and a tributary of the Ebbw River.

Sources 

The Sirhowy River has its source on the slopes of Cefn Pyllau-duon above Tredegar. After flowing through Siôn-Sieffre's Reservoir it turns south through Tredegar and then Blackwood and Pontllanfraith. It turns eastwards near Cwmfelinfach and joins the River Ebbw near Crosskeys.

External links 
 The confluence of the Sirhowy and the Ebbw at Crosskeys : photograph from the Crosskeys website
www.geograph.co.uk : photo of the Sirhowy River

Rivers of Blaenau Gwent
Rivers of Caerphilly County Borough